Warren Patrick O'Hora (born 19 April 1999) is an Irish professional footballer who plays as a defender for  club Milton Keynes Dons.

Club career

Bohemians
O'Hora joined the academy of Bohemians at a young age. After progressing through several age groups he eventually broke into first team contention in 2016. He made his first team league debut on 16 June 2017, coming on as a 76th-minute substitute in a 3–1 away win over St Patrick's Athletic.

Brighton & Hove Albion
On 12 January 2018, following a successful trial period, O'Hora signed for English Premier League club Brighton & Hove Albion for an undisclosed fee, initially joining the club's reserve squad playing in Premier League 2.

Over the following two seasons he featured regularly for the reserve team, making over 30 appearances and scoring 4 goals. He was later awarded the club's Young Player of the Year honour for the 2019–20 season.

Milton Keynes Dons
On 21 August 2020, O'Hora joined League One club Milton Keynes Dons on a season-long loan. He made his debut on 8 September 2020, playing the full match of the 3–1 home win over Northampton in the EFL Trophy. He made his league debut in a 1–1 away draw at Doncaster. After 17 appearances in all competitions, O'Hora made his loan move permanent on 18 January 2021 for an undisclosed fee. On 2 March 2021, he scored his first senior professional goal in a 3–2 away defeat to Gillingham. On 19 August 2022, O'Hora signed an extension to his contract keeping him at the club beyond the 2022–23 season.

International career
Having featured for the Republic of Ireland U18 and U19 sides earlier in his career, O'Hora was later called up to a Republic of Ireland U21 training camp ahead of their UEFA Euro U21 2021 qualifying matches in October 2020.

Career statistics

Honours
Individual
Brighton & Hove Albion Young Player of the Year:  2019–20

References

1999 births
Living people
Association football defenders
Republic of Ireland association footballers
Republic of Ireland youth international footballers
Bohemian F.C. players
Brighton & Hove Albion F.C. players
Milton Keynes Dons F.C. players
English Football League players
League of Ireland players
Republic of Ireland under-21 international footballers